Fernando Irayzoz (1 November 1924 – 17 February 1989) was a Spanish modern pentathlete. He competed at the 1960 Summer Olympics.

References

1924 births
1989 deaths
Spanish male modern pentathletes
Olympic modern pentathletes of Spain
Modern pentathletes at the 1960 Summer Olympics
Sportspeople from Barcelona